Timirovo (Timer) is a rural locality (a village) in Gafurovsky Selsoviet, Tuymazinsky District, Bashkortostan, Russia. The population was 132 as of 2010. There are 5 streets.

Geography 
Timirovo is located 18 km southeast of Tuymazy (the district's administrative centre) by road.

References 

Rural localities in Tuymazinsky District